Patrick Sebastian Keogh (born 7 May 1976 in Glasgow) is a Scottish football player, whose most recent club was Scottish Third Division side Forfar Athletic.

Career 

Keogh originally played Junior football for Maryhill, and moved to Clyde with a batch of other Junior players in 1998. This move was successful; Clyde gained promotion to the Scottish First Division.

He was most successfully deployed as a forward at Clyde, where he scored some spectacular goals. Keogh spent six years at Broadwood and became a fan favourite. He scored a hat-trick in his last game for the club, in a 5–2 win against Brechin City.

After signing for Hamilton Academical (where he linked up with the management team who signed him for Clyde, Allan Maitland and Ronnie MacDonald) and then Partick Thistle, he made his way to Stranraer where he was named captain for the 2007-08 season.

After playing in only a handful of games for Stranraer, Keogh signed for Scottish Third Division side Forfar Athletic in June 2008, but after his appearances were limited by injuries he was released by the club in February 2009. Beith Juniors signed Keogh later that month, but injuries prevented him from ever playing for the club.

Coaching 

After retirement, Keogh returned to Broadwood as a youth team coach in 2013.

He eventually returned to Maryhill Juniors as well, this time as a first team coach.

Personal life 

Keogh grew up in the Maryhill area of Glasgow.

His grandfather Basil Keogh also played for Clyde in the 1950's, while the club played at Shawfield.

Honours 

 Clyde
 Scottish Second Division: 1999–2000
 Scottish First Division: Runner-up 2002–03, 2003–04

 Hamilton
Scottish Challenge Cup: Runners-up 2005–06

References

External links

Living people
1976 births
Footballers from Glasgow
Scottish footballers
Scottish Football League players
Scottish Junior Football Association players
Maryhill F.C. players
Clyde F.C. players
Hamilton Academical F.C. players
Partick Thistle F.C. players
Stranraer F.C. players
Forfar Athletic F.C. players
Association football utility players
Association football defenders
Association football forwards